Harlan C. Hansen (September 3, 1892 – September 8, 1977) was an American football player who played with the Green Bay Packers of the National Football League (NFL). Prior to playing professionally, Hansen played college football at the University of Minnesota.

References

1892 births
1977 deaths
American football ends
American football fullbacks
American football halfbacks
Green Bay Packers players
Minnesota Golden Gophers football players
People from Cass County, Iowa
Players of American football from Minneapolis